KANB may refer to:

KANB-LP, a low-power radio station (102.3 FM) licensed to Kalispell, Montana, United States
the ICAO code for Anniston Metropolitan Airport in Anniston, Alabama, United States